Kamil Nasibov (8 October 1946, Bozlu, Lachin District, Azerbaijan – 29 June 1992, Lachin District, Azerbaijan) was the National Hero of Azerbaijan, and warrior of the First Nagorno-Karabakh War.

Early life and education 
Kamil Nasibov was born on 8 October 1946 in Bozlu village of Lachin District of Azerbaijan SSR. He was an ethnic Kurd. In 1963, he completed his secondary education at Minkend village secondary school. From 1963 through 1966, Nasibov served in the Soviet Armed Forces. In 1976, he entered Azerbaijan Polytechnical Institute.

Personal life 
Kamil Nasibov was married and had four children.

First Nagorno-Karabakh war 
When Lachin was attacked by the Armenian Armed Forces in 1992, Nasibov created a self-defense unit of volunteers that consisted of 30 people. Nasibov participated in the battles around the villages of Sadinlar, Malibeyli, Khanallar, Suarası with his self-defense unit.

On June 29, 1992, Kamil Nasibov was seriously wounded in a battle for the Blind Heavens and soldiers wanted to take him safely, but he did not leave the battlefield and eventually died of bleeding.

Honors 
Kamil Nasibov was buried at a cemetery in Aghjabadi. By the Decree of the President of Azerbaijan No. 457 dated February 5, 1993, he was posthumously awarded the title of the National Hero of Azerbaijan.

See also 
 First Nagorno-Karabakh War
 National Hero of Azerbaijan

References

Sources 
Vugar Asgarov. Azərbaycanın Milli Qəhrəmanları (Yenidən işlənmiş II nəşr). Bakı: "Dərələyəz-M", 2010, səh. 226.

1946 births
1992 deaths
Azerbaijani military personnel
Azerbaijani military personnel of the Nagorno-Karabakh War
Azerbaijani military personnel killed in action
National Heroes of Azerbaijan
People from Lachin District